Amber Rose Tamblyn (born May 14, 1983) is an American actress and writer. She first came to national attention in her role on the soap opera General Hospital as Emily Quartermaine at the age of 11. She followed with a starring role on the prime-time series Joan of Arcadia, portraying the title character, Joan Girardi, for which she received Primetime Emmy and Golden Globe nominations. Her feature film work includes roles such as Tibby Rollins from the first two The Sisterhood of the Traveling Pants and Megan McBride in 127 Hours (2010), as well as the critically acclaimed film, Stephanie Daley opposite Tilda Swinton which debuted at The Sundance Film Festival and for which Tamblyn won Best Actress at The Locarno International Film Festival and was nominated for an Independent Spirit Award. In 2021 she starred opposite Diane Lane in FX's Y: The Last Man.

Tamblyn is a published author and cultural critic at large. She has published seven books across genres, and writes for The New York Times and other publications on issues of gender inequality and women's rage.

Early life
Tamblyn was born in Santa Monica, California. Her father, Russ Tamblyn, is an actor, dancer, and singer who starred in the 1961 film West Side Story, the 1954 film Seven Brides for Seven Brothers and the television series Twin Peaks, and her mother, Bonnie Murray, is a singer, teacher, and artist. Her paternal grandfather, Eddie Tamblyn, was a vaudeville performer. Her uncle is Larry Tamblyn, who is the keyboardist in the 1960s rock band The Standells. She attended the Santa Monica Alternative School House, which, in her words, was "very unorthodox, no letter grades". At the age of ten, she played Pippi Longstocking in a school play; her father's agent, Sharon Debord, was attending as a family friend and ended up convincing her father to allow Tamblyn to go on auditions.

Career

Television

Tamblyn's first TV role was Emily Bowen (later known as Emily Quartermaine) on the soap opera General Hospital, a role that she played for six years (from 1995 to 2001). She also starred in "Evergreen", the pilot episode of the second The Twilight Zone revival in 2002. Tamblyn became better known playing Joan Girardi, a teenage girl who receives frequent visits from God, on the CBS drama series Joan of Arcadia. Tamblyn's father made several appearances as God in the form of a dog walker on the show, which ran from 2003 to 2005.

Early guest-starring roles include: Buffy the Vampire Slayer (playing Janice Penshaw, the best friend of Dawn Summers), Boston Public, CSI: Miami, and Punk'd, where Ashton Kutcher and his crew members tricked her into losing someone else's dog. In 2007, she starred in the CBS pilot for Babylon Fields, an apocalyptic comedic drama about the undead trying to resume their former lives. The CBS network excluded the show from its fall programming lineup, since it would have competed with the network's other undead-themed drama, Moonlight.

In spring 2009, Tamblyn starred in The Unusuals, as NYPD homicide detective Casey Shraeger. The show was canceled after its first season. In the same year, she had a recurring role alongside her eventual husband David Cross in the IFC sitcom The Increasingly Poor Decisions of Todd Margaret.

From November 2010 until April 2011, she starred as medical student Martha M. Masters in the seventh season of the Fox medical drama series House. She returned for the series finale in 2012.

In August 2013, Tamblyn was cast as Charlie Harper's long-lost (and previously unknown) lesbian daughter, Jenny, on the sitcom Two and a Half Men, opposite Ashton Kutcher and Jon Cryer. Her first appearance was on the season 11 opener, September 26, 2013.

She has appeared on numerous episodes of Comedy Central's Inside Amy Schumer, including the "Milk Milk Lemonade" sketch which aired in 2015. She has also guest starred on IFC's Portlandia and Comedy Bang! Bang!, as well as numerous shows on Adult Swim, including The Heart, She Holler opposite Patton Oswalt and Metalocalypse.

In 2021, Tamblyn starred opposite Diane Lane in the critically acclaimed FX television series "Y The Last man" based on the beloved graphic novel.

Films
Tamblyn launched her film career playing bit parts in her father's movies: Rebellious and Johnny Mysto: Boy Wizard. She also appeared in 1995's Live Nude Girls. Her first major film role was in 2005's The Sisterhood of the Traveling Pants as Tibby Rollins, co-starring Alexis Bledel, America Ferrera, and Blake Lively. She reprised the role in the 2008 sequel, The Sisterhood of the Traveling Pants 2.

Her horror film career began with the opening scene of 2002's The Ring. Tamblyn also appeared in the Japan-set The Grudge 2. The film, which also stars Sarah Michelle Gellar, was released on October 13, 2006, and debuted in the #1 spot at the North American box office. In August 2010, she won the Bronze Leopard at the Locarno International Film Festival for her performance in the title role of Stephanie Daley. The film, which also won an award at the 2006 Sundance Film Festival, features Tamblyn as a 16-year-old who kills her baby moments after giving birth in the bathroom of a ski resort. She was also nominated for Best Actress at the Independent Spirit Awards. The film also stars Tilda Swinton and Timothy Hutton.

In January 2008, Tamblyn appeared in the Hallmark film The Russell Girl, about a woman suffering from disease and mental anguish. Also in 2008, She also starred in Blackout. She appeared in the 2009 film Spring Breakdown, also featuring Amy Poehler, Rachel Dratch, and Parker Posey. Tamblyn appeared alongside Orlando Bloom, Colin Firth, and Patricia Clarkson in the 2010 film Main Street, a drama set in North Carolina. That year, she also had a role in the drama 127 Hours, with James Franco.

In 2012, Tamblyn starred alongside Wes Bentley and Vincent Piazza in the indie feature 3 Nights in the Desert directed by Gabriel Cowan, written by playwright Adam Chanzit and produced by John Suits. In 2015, she starred opposite Bob Odenkirk in the Netflix original film, Girlfriend's Day. In the same year, Tamblyn also made a cameo appearance with her father Russ in the Spaghetti Western Django Unchained.

Theater
Tamblyn attended a grade school for the theatrical arts from the age of 5 to 14. She was discovered as an actress at the age of 9 when she starred in Pippi Longstocking. In 2014, she originated the role of Daisy Domergue for the live reading at the Ace Theater in Los Angeles of Quentin Tarantino's The Hateful Eight. She was hand picked by Tarantino, a long-time friend, along with fellow cast members Samuel L. Jackson, Kurt Russell, and others. Tamblyn starred in Neil LaBute's Reasons to Be Pretty at the Geffen Playhouse in 2014, which received critical acclaim.

Tamblyn serves on the board of directors for Soho Rep Theater in New York.

Writings

In 2005, Simon & Schuster Children's Publishing published her debut book of poems, written between the ages of 11 and 21, entitled Free Stallion. The School Library Journals review states that, "Free Stallion is a compilation of poetry that amounts to a portrait of the artist as a teenager... Many of the selections are appropriately self-absorbed but move beyond journalistic catharsis to real insight and stunning language for one so young." Poet Laureate Lawrence Ferlinghetti called the book, "A fine, fruitful gestation of throbbingly nascent sexuality, awakened in young new language." Tamblyn has toured extensively with poet Derrick C. Brown, including the Lazers of Sexcellence tours. In 2008, she was featured in the Write Bloody Publishing anthology, The Last American Valentine: Illustrated Poems to Seduce and Destroy.

In 2009, Manic D. Press published her second collection of poetry, Ditto.

In 2015, HarperCollins published her third collection, a hybrid of poetry and art called "Dark Sparker" which explored the lives and death of child star actresses. The book was a large critical success and bestseller, which features accompanying original art from Marilyn Manson, David Lynch, Marcel Dazma, Adrian Tomine, and many others. For the book's publication launch in 2015, Tamblyn and the band Yo La Tengo created an hour long poetry and music show incorporating poems from Tamblyn's book. They performed the show in New York at Housing Works and in Los Angeles at The Hollywood Forever Cemetery.

Tamblyn's first novel, Any Man, was released June 2018. Its plot centers on a serial female rapist who preys on men. Her second book, a memoir and feminist manifesto titled Era of Ignition, was released in March 2019. The book is a personal exploration of feminism during divisive times.

In 2019, Penguin Random House published a collection of her cultural criticism and memoir essays, "Era of Ignition; Coming of Age in a Time of Rage and Revolution."

Tamblyn has self-published two chapbooks of poetry, Of the Dawn and Plenty of Ships, and has participated in poetry readings at various venues, particularly in California. The Loneliest, a poem book inspired by Thelonious Monk and his music, was published in 2005 and contains haiku poetry written by Tamblyn and coupled with collages by George Herms.

Tamblyn appeared in a poetry concert film recorded on August 4, 2002, in Los Angeles, The Drums Inside Your Chest. A new collection of poetry, Bang Ditto, was published in September 2009 by San Francisco's Manic D Press. Beginning in October 2009, she began blogging for the Poetry Foundation's blog, Harriet. Her poem "Bridgette Anderson" was one of the poems featured in Saul Williams' book Chorus, published by MTV Books in September 2011.

In 2007, she co-founded Write Now Poetry Society, dedicated to creating unique and quality poetry programming. The non-profit has a long history with The Getty Museum, curating poetry events in conjunction with art openings, such as 2011's Dark Blushing, featuring new poems commissioned by poets Patricia Smith and NEA fellow Jeffrey McDaniel, based on works of art by Dante Gabriel Rossetti and William Blake. Since 2011, Tamblyn has reviewed books of poetry by women for iconic feminist magazine, BUST Magazine.

James Woods allegation and Hasidic incident 

In a series of September 2017 tweets later reiterated in an open letter published in Teen Vogue, she said that actor James Woods tried to seduce her and a friend at a restaurant and offered to take them to Las Vegas when both Tamblyn and her friend were 16. Woods denied her allegations, calling them a "lie." Tamblyn later wrote an essay for The New York Times in which she said that Woods’s "accusation that I was lying sent me back to that day in that producer’s office, and back to all the days I’ve spent in the offices of men; of feeling unsure, uneasy, questioned and disbelieved, no matter the conversation."

In March 2018, Tamblyn came under criticism for tweets about New York City's Hasidic Jewish community following an incident in Brooklyn involving her daughter. Tamblyn said she was nearly struck by a van driven by a Hasidic Jewish man while walking with her daughter in a stroller. She said "this is not the first time a man from the Hasidic community in NYC has attempted to harm me or other women I know. Any woman riding a bike through South Williamsburg can attest. I hope this guy is caught." Writing in Tablet, journalist Liel Leibovitz chided Tamblyn for "speaking so hurtfully about an entire community of underprivileged people." Tamblyn denied accusations of anti-Semitism.

Personal life

Tamblyn and actor-comedian David Cross became engaged in August 2011, and married on October 6, 2012. On February 21, 2017, Tamblyn announced that she and Cross had recently had a daughter.

She is sometimes said to be the goddaughter of musician Neil Young and actors Dean Stockwell and Dennis Hopper, although in a 2009 interview with Parade, Tamblyn explained that "godfather" was "just a loose term" for Stockwell, Hopper and Young, three famous friends of her father's who were always around the house when she was growing up, and who were big influences on her life.

Tamblyn supported and campaigned for Hillary Clinton during the 2016 United States presidential election. On social media, Tamblyn urged voters to check voter ID requirements citing VoteRiders as a source of assistance across the United States.

She is one of the founders of the non-profit organization Time's Up, which was created to combat workplace sexual harassment. She is also a feminist.

She was the writing mentee of the late San Francisco Poet Laureate, Jack Hirschman.

Relationship with parents
In June 2021, Tamblyn wrote an essay in The New York Times expressing solidarity with Britney Spears' effort to end the conservatorship controlling her life. Tamblyn wrote that she became financially successful when she turned 21 and starred in Joan of Arcadia. Her father became her co-manager, and her mother her business manager. She wrote that having her parents on the payroll damaged their relationship, that she was "everybody's ATM" and that her money "paid for our vacations, dinners out, and sometimes even the bills. When it finally came time to disentangle our personal and professional relationships, it was deeply painful for all three of us."

Filmography

Film

Television

Music videos

Bibliography
 Free Stallion: Poems New York: Simon & Schuster Children, 2004.  
 Bang Ditto San Francisco: Manic D Press, 2009. , 
 Dark Sparkler New York: Harper Perennial, 2015.  
 "The Punishment Gift" New York: Bottle of Smoke Press, Limited Edition 
 Any Man New York: Harper Perennial, 2018. , 
 Era of ignition, New York: Crown Archetype, 2019. , 
 "Listening in the Dark" Fall 2022, HarperCollins

Discography

Awards and nominations

Tamblyn's portrayal of Joan Girardi earned her both Golden Globe Award and Primetime Emmy Award nominations in 2004. She was also nominated for a Saturn Award for Best Actress in a Television Series in 2004 and 2005. Her role on House ended with her having multiple nominations for her final performance as Martha Masters.

References

External links

 
 
 Free Stallion from the Simon & Schuster website

1983 births
Living people
20th-century American actresses
21st-century American actresses
21st-century American poets
21st-century American women writers
Actresses from Santa Monica, California
American child actresses
American feminist writers
American film actresses
American soap opera actresses
American television actresses
American women poets
American women screenwriters
People from Topanga, California
Poets from California
Writers from Santa Monica, California
Screenwriters from California
English-language haiku poets
21st-century American screenwriters